Treat Huey and Frederik Nielsen won the 2014 edition, defeating Lewis Burton and Marcus Willis 3–6, 6–3, [10-2].

Seeds

Draw

Main draw

References
 Main Draw
 Qualifying Draw

Charlottesville Men's Pro Challenger - Doubles
2014 Doubles